

The San Jose de Gracia Church, also known as Church of Santo Tomas Del Rio de Las Trampas, is a historic church on the main plaza of Las Trampas, New Mexico.  Built between 1760 and 1776, it is one of the least-altered examples of a Spanish Colonial Pueblo mission church, with adobe walls rising  in height.  It was declared a National Historic Landmark in 1970.

Description and history
The village of Las Trampas is located on New Mexico State Road 76, the "high road" between Santa Fe and Taos. Its main plaza is an open dirt expanse on the east side of that road, with the church on the plaza's north side. The church has a cruciform plan, and is built out of adobe finished in mud plaster. The adobe roof is supported by vigas overlaid by planking, the vigas mounted into specially shaped corbels. An unusual and distinctive feature of this church is a clerestory window above the nave that is oriented to allow sunlight to fall into the apse area. The main entrance is at the southern end of the nave, between a pair of buttresses, which also support a wooden balcony at the gallery level.

The community of Las Trampas was founded in 1751 by twelve Spanish families.  Originally sheltered by an adobe wall that encircled the plaza, the community grew to 63 families 1776, when the church was completed.  The church escaped significant alteration due to the economic isolation of the community until the 20th century.  The roof has been replaced several times, including in 1932 by the Society for the Preservation of New Mexico Mission Churches, led by renowned architect John Gaw Meem.  The church ceiling is painted with 18th and 19th century designs, and the interior is decorated with notable artworks of 18th and 19th century santeros. The annual feast day is March 19.

Gallery

See also

National Register of Historic Places listings in Taos County, New Mexico
List of National Historic Landmarks in New Mexico

References

External links

NPS National Historical Landmarks: San José de Gracia Church webpage

Archive.org: The Architecture of San José de Gracia
Las Trampas photos at Library of Congress

Churches in Taos County, New Mexico
Roman Catholic churches completed in 1760
Roman Catholic churches in New Mexico
National Historic Landmarks in New Mexico
Churches on the National Register of Historic Places in New Mexico
Historic American Buildings Survey in New Mexico
Spanish Colonial architecture in New Mexico
18th-century Roman Catholic church buildings in the United States
National Register of Historic Places in Taos County, New Mexico
Adobe churches in New Mexico